Link Transit is the public transit authority of Chelan and Douglas counties in the U.S. state of Washington. It operates fixed bus and paratransit services between 17 communities in the Wenatchee–East Wenatchee metropolitan area, including the cities of Chelan, Leavenworth, Waterville and Wenatchee. In 2014, Link Transit carried 987,376 passengers on its 18 bus routes.

It is one of only two public transportation benefit areas, along with Ben Franklin Transit in the Tri-Cities, to cover more than one county. The Chelan-Douglas Public Transportation Benefit Area was founded in November 1989 and a 0.4% sales tax was approved by voters in September 1990 to fund a bus system. The Link Transit moniker was adopted shortly before bus service began on December 16, 1991. Link Transit was initially a fare-free system until February 2000.

Routes

Link Transit operates 18 bus routes from Monday through Saturday. 3 of these routes are "trolley" routes using trolley-replica buses branded as "The Current", running electric battery buses and not charging fares; 6 are intercity routes connecting Wenatchee to outlying communities via major highways; and one is a season route to the Mission Ridge Ski Area, branded as "SkiLink", which is free for pass holders to the resort. Link Transit also operates one dial-a-ride service in Leavenworth.

Most of these bus routes connect to the three main transit centers in Wenatchee and its suburbs: Columbia Station, Wenatchee Valley Mall in East Wenatchee, and Olds Station Park & Ride. Most routes also operate in loops with one-way segments.

Bus routes

Intercity routes

Shuttle and urban routes

Shuttle routes are fare-free and run at higher frequencies.

Fleet

Link Transit operates electric buses, powered by batteries, on its "Current" frequent routes in Wenatchee and East Wenatchee. The first batch of five buses manufactured by EBus was delivered in 2014 and funded by a $2.9 million grant from the Federal Transit Administration (FTA). In 2016, the FTA awarded a $3.8 million grant to Link Transit to purchase additional electric buses to replace older diesel vehicles; Link Transit awarded a four-bus order to BYD Auto for their K9 electric buses.

Link Transit received its BYD electric buses in 2017 and outfitted one with an experimental wireless 200 kW charger, the first of its kind in the United States.

Current Bus Fleet

References

External links

Bus transportation in Washington (state)
Transportation in Chelan County, Washington
Transportation in Douglas County, Washington